The men's 500 metres event was held February 1. 12 athletes participated.

Schedule
All times are Almaty Time (UTC+06:00)

Records

500 meters

500 meters × 2

Results
Legend
DNF — Did not finish
DNS — Did not start

References

Men 500